The following is a list of all 120 of the Doges of Venice ordered by the dates of their reigns.

For more than 1,000 years, the chief magistrate and leader of the city of Venice and later of the Most Serene Republic of Venice was styled the Doge, a rare but not unique Italian title derived from the Latin Dux. Doges of Venice were elected for life by the city-state's aristocracy. The Venetian combination of elaborate monarchic pomp and a republican (though "aristocratic") constitution with intricate checks and balances makes "La serenissima" (Venice) a textbook example of a crowned republic.

Despite the great power given to them, the Venetian Doges were restricted by law (unlike the Doges of the Republic of Genoa) to spend the rest of their lives inside the Doge's Palace complex and St Mark's Basilica, occasionally leaving for diplomatic reasons.

Byzantine period

Magister militum per Venetiae

Ducal period

Republican period

Legacy
After the Fall of the Republic of Venice, the position of Doge was abolished. Instead, from 1806 to 1866, a Podestà of Venice was appointed by the rulers of the city: Napoleon and the Habsburgs.

In 1860, the nascent Kingdom of Italy created the office of the Mayor of Venice (Sindaco di Venezia), chosen by the City council.

From 1946 to 1993, the Mayor of Venice was chosen by the City Council. Since 1993, under provisions of new local administration law, the Mayor of Venice has been chosen by popular election, originally every four and, later, every five years.

References

Bibliography
 Norwich, John Julius. A History of Venice. New York: Vintage Books, 1989. .

 List of Doges of Venice
Venice
Venice
Doges